Lesbian, gay, bisexual, and transgender (LGBT) persons in Ivory Coast face legal challenges not experienced by non-LGBT residents. Both male and female same-sex sexual activity is legal in Ivory Coast, but same-sex couples and households headed by same-sex couples are not eligible for the same legal protections available to opposite-sex couples.

Laws regarding same-sex sexual activity
Same-sex sexual acts in private are legal and have never been criminalized within Ivory Coast, due in part to Ivory Coast being a former French colony and not inheriting sodomy laws from France, unlike many former British colonies around the world.

As for public same-sex sexual acts, Article 360 of the Penal Code states this:
Est puni d'un emprisonnement de trois mois à deux ans et d'une amende de 50 000 à 500 000 francs quiconque commet un outrage public à la pudeur. Si l'outrage public à la pudeur consiste en un acte impudique ou contre nature avec un individu du même sexe l'emprisonnement est de six mois à deux ans et l'amende de 50 000 à 300 000 francs. Les peines peuvent être portées au double si le délit a été commis envers un mineur ou en présence d'un mineur de dix huit ans.
Translation:
Whoever commits a public breach of decency will be punished with imprisonment for three months to two years and a fine of 50,000 to 500,000 francs. If the public breach of decency consists of an act that is indecent or contrary to nature with an individual of the same sex, the term of imprisonment will be from six months to two years and the fine will be from 50,000 to 300,000 francs. The penalties may be doubled if the crime is committed against a minor or in the presence of a minor of 18 years of age.

Recognition of same-sex relationships
The government of Ivory Coast does not recognize same-sex couples.

Adoption and family planning

According to the U.S. Department of State, "gay and lesbian individuals and couples are not legally recognized as eligible to adopt".

Discrimination protections
There is no legal protection against discrimination based on sexual orientation or gender identity.

However, in March 2010, while attending the United Nations Human Right Council Universal Periodic Review, the representative of Ivory Coast stated that they would begin, "to take measures to ensure non-discrimination on grounds of sexual orientation and gender identity", but that they would not start "awareness-raising programs" because it was not a "current priority".

Living conditions
The U.S. Department of State's 2011 Human Rights Report found that,
There was no official discrimination based on sexual orientation in employment, housing, statelessness, or access to education or health care. However, societal stigmatization of the LGBT community was reportedly widespread, and the government did not act to counter it during the year. Gay men were reportedly subjected to beatings, imprisonment, verbal abuse, humiliation, and extortion by police, gendarmes, and members of the armed forces. During the year the Force Republiques de Côte d'Ivoire (FRCI) reportedly beat and abused gay men and transgender persons, most of them sex workers. Complaints were not filed for fear of reprisals. The situation of the LGBT community reportedly improved after the postelectoral crisis but remained precarious. The few LGBT organizations in the country operated with caution to avoid being targeted by the FRCI and former Forces de Défense et de Sécurité members. However, newspapers reported favorably on a New Year's Eve party held by a group of lesbians in Abidjan.

Touré Claver, president of the LGBT group Alternative Côte d'Ivoire, recalled in September 2011 that a doctor refused service a few years ago to a patient because of the patient's sexual orientation. Claver and a few members of the group then protested outside the healthcare center where the doctor worked, eventually ending with the patient receiving care. Claver stated that overall, "There is still discrimination against gay people, but generally we are moving toward relative tolerance."

Summary table

See also

LGBT rights in Africa
Human rights in Africa

Notes

References